Las Vegas Tabagators was an American women's soccer team, founded in 2005. The team was a member of the Women's Premier Soccer League, the third tier of women’s soccer in the United States and Canada, until 2006, when the team left the league and the franchise was terminated.

The team played its home games in the Bettye Wilson Soccer Complex in Las Vegas, Nevada. The team's colors were white, gold and black.

The name "Tabagators" came from TAB Contractors, the team's sponsor. Prior to joining the WPSL the Tabagators were among the most successful youth clubs in the region, having won 5 state titles.

The team was associated with the National Premier Soccer League franchise Las Vegas Strikers, which has also since folded.

Year-by-year

References

   

Women's Premier Soccer League teams
Women's soccer clubs in the United States
Sports teams in Las Vegas
Soccer clubs in Nevada
2005 establishments in Nevada
2006 disestablishments in Nevada
Association football clubs established in 2005
Association football clubs disestablished in 2006
Women's sports in Nevada